Sweltsa lateralis, the curved sallfly, is a species of green stonefly in the family Chloroperlidae. It is found in North America.

References

Chloroperlidae
Articles created by Qbugbot
Insects described in 1911